Moulin Rouge is a cabaret in Paris, on Boulevard de Clichy, at Place Blanche, the intersection of, and terminus of Rue Blanche.

In 1889, the Moulin Rouge was co-founded  by Charles Zidler and Joseph Oller, who also owned the Paris Olympia. The original venue was destroyed by fire in 1915. Moulin Rouge is southwest of Montmartre, in the Paris district of Pigalle on Boulevard de Clichy in the 18th arrondissement, it has a red windmill on its roof. The closest métro station is Blanche.

Moulin Rouge is best known as the birthplace of the modern form of the can-can dance. Originally introduced as a seductive dance by the courtesans who operated from the site, the can-can dance revue evolved into a form of entertainment of its own and led to the introduction of cabarets across Europe. Today, the Moulin Rouge is a tourist attraction, offering predominantly musical dance entertainment for visitors from around the world. The club's decor still contains much of the romance of fin de siècle France.

History

Background
The Belle Époque was a period of peace and optimism marked by industrial progress, and a particularly rich cultural exuberance was present at the opening of the Moulin Rouge. The Expositions Universelles of 1889 and 1900 are symbols of this period. 

The Eiffel Tower was also constructed in 1889, epitomising the spirit of progress along with the culturally transgressive cabaret. Japonism, an artistic movement inspired by the Orient, with Henri de Toulouse-Lautrec as its most brilliant disciple, was also at its height. Montmartre, which, at the heart of an increasingly vast and impersonal Paris, retained a bohemian village atmosphere; festivities and artists mixed with pleasure and beauty as their values.

Creation and early success
On 6 October 1889, the Moulin Rouge opened as the Jardin de Paris, an outdoor garden café-conçert, at the foot of the Montmartre hill. Its creator Joseph Oller and his Manager Charles Zidler were formidable businessmen who understood the public's tastes. The aim was to allow the very rich to come and 'slum it' in a fashionable district, Montmartre. The extravagant setting – the garden was adorned with a gigantic elephant – allowed people from all walks of life to mix. Workers, local residents, artists, the middle classes, businessmen, elegant women, and foreigners passing through Paris rubbed shoulders. Nicknamed "The First Palace of Women" by Oller and Zidler, the cabaret quickly became a great success.
The ingredients for its success:
 A revolutionary architecture for the auditorium that allowed rapid changes of décor and where everyone could mix;
 Festive champagne evenings where people danced and were entertained thanks to amusing acts that changed regularly, such as Le Pétomane;
 A new dance inspired by the quadrille which becomes more and more popular: The Can-can, danced to a furious rhythm by dancers in titillating costumes;
 Famous dancers whom history still remembers: la Goulue, Jane Avril, la Môme Fromage, Grille d'Egout, Nini Pattes en l'Air, Yvette Guilbert, Valentin le désossé, and the clown Cha-U-Kao;
 A place loved by artists, including Toulouse-Lautrec whose posters and paintings secured rapid and international fame for the Moulin Rouge.

Greatest moments
 The early years of the Moulin Rouge are marked by extravagant shows, inspired by the circus, and attractions that are still famous such as Pétomane. Concert-dances are organised every day at 10pm.
 1886–1910: Footit and Chocolat, a comic act of a white, authoritarian clown and a black, long-suffering Auguste, are very popular and often appear on the Moulin Rouge poster.
 19 April 1890: 1st review, "Circassiens et Circassiennes".
 26 October 1890: the Prince of Wales, the future Edward VII, who on a private visit to Paris, booked a table to see this quadrille whose reputation had already crossed the Channel. Recognising him, La Goulue, with her leg in the air and her head in her skirts, spontaneously called out "Hey, Wales, the champagne's on you!".
 1891: La Goulue: Toulouse-Lautrec's first poster for the Moulin Rouge.
 1893: The "Bal des Quat'z'Arts" caused a scandal with its procession of a nude Cleopatra surrounded by young naked women.
 12 November 1897: The Moulin Rouge closed its doors for the first time for the funeral of its manager and cofounder, Charles Zidler. Yvette Guilbert paid him homage saying, "You have the knack of creating popular pleasure, in the finest sense of the word, of entertaining crowds with subtlety, according to the status of those to be entertained".
 1900: visitors from around the world, attracted by the Universal Exhibition, flock to the "Moulin Rouge". This gave Paris a reputation as a city of decadent pleasure. In many other countries imitation "Moulin Rouges" and "Montmartres" sprang up.

Operetta and grand shows
 January 1903: the Moulin Rouge reopened after renovation and improvement work carried out by Édouard Niermans, the most "Parisian" architect of the Belle Époque (amongst other works he designed the brasserie Mollard, the Casino de Paris, the Folies Bergère in Paris, the Palace Hôtel in Ostend in Belgium, the rebuilding of the Hôtel du Palais in Biarritz, and the creation of the Hotel Negresco on the Promenade des Anglais in Nice). First aperitif concert, where the elite of the fashionable world met for dinner and a show in a setting more beautiful and comfortable than any that existed elsewhere.
 Until the First World War, the Moulin Rouge became a real temple of operetta. Further successful shows follow: Voluptata, La Feuille de Vigne, le Rêve d'Egypte, Tais-toi tu m'affoles and many others, each with a more evocative title than the last.
 3 January 1907: during the show le Rêve d'Egypte, Colette exchanged kisses that showed her links with the Duchess of Morny. Deemed to be scandalous, the show was banned.
 29 July 1907: first appearance of Mistinguett on stage at the Moulin Rouge in the Revue de la Femme. Her talent was immediately obvious. The following year she had a huge success with Max Dearly in la Valse chaloupée.
 Mistinguett was born in poverty and had an undeniably quick wit. She wanted to build her own life and said "the poor suburbs, it's not enough just to want to get out. I had a talent: life. All the rest remains to be done, to be thought about. I couldn't allow myself just to be a beautiful animal, I had to think of everything". A peerless businesswoman, she first listened carefully then captivated. She lived wholly for her art, and toured Europe and the United States.
 9 April 1910: A former lady-in-waiting to the Empress Eugénie attended a showing of the Revue Amoureuse at the Moulin Rouge. She was so enchanted by the faithful recreation of the ceremony for the return of the troops from Italy that she could not stop herself from calling out "Long Live the Empress!"
 27 February 1915: the Moulin Rouge was destroyed by fire.
 1925: The rebuilt Moulin Rouge reopened.

Mistinguett years
 After World War I, Francis Salabert took charge of the Moulin Rouge. A businessman rather than a showman, he gave Jacques-Charles, the leading impresario of the time, the task of reinvigorating the cabaret. The Moulin Rouge took off again, thanks to stars such as Mistinguett, Jeanne Aubert, and Maurice Chevalier, and gave the first showing in Paris of American revues with the Hoffmann Girls.
 In 1923, composer and conductor Raphaël Beretta, who directed the Folies Bergères, the Olympia and the Casino de Paris, proposed to rebuild the music hall of the Moulin Rouge in a large construction. The mill rose in the middle of the facade supported by a round part decorated at the top with oval dormers.
 Gesmar, aged 20, became set designer. His drawings and models will always be associated with the image of the Moulin Rouge.
 Jacques-Charles and Mistinguett were the originators of:
 1925 : la Revue Mistinguett
 1926 : Ça c'est Paris
 1928 : Paris qui tourne
 An incident occurred during the 1927 show when female dancers were meant to pop out of huge multi-tiered artificial cakes covered in real frosting. When the girls descended to the stage, the soles of their high heels got doused in cake cream which proved extremely slippery and caused them to constantly slip and fall on stage, ruining the whole show.
 At the Moulin Rouge, Mistinguett created many enduring songs, including "Valencia", "Ça c'est Paris", both by Jose Padilla, "Il m'a vue nue", "On m' suit", "La Java de Doudoune", the latter with Jean Gabin.

After Mistinguett

 1929: Mistinguett retires from the stage and leaves the Moulin Rouge.
 After her departure, the ballroom is transformed into the most ultra-modern Night Club of the time.
 June – August 1929: the revue Lew Leslie's Blackbirds, starring jazz singer and Broadway star Adelaide Hall, with a troop of a hundred black artists accompanied by the Jazz Plantation Orchestra, opens at the Moulin Rouge and becomes the hit of the season.
 1937: the Cotton Club, all the rage in New York, is put on at the Moulin Rouge; Ray Ventura and his Collegians also appear.
 1939–1945 Second World War. The German Occupation Guide aryien counts the Moulin Rouge among the must visits in Paris. Its famous stage shows continued for the occupation troops, which are mentioned in various autobiographies of German officers, such as Ernst Jünger, Gerhard Heller and others. The Germans used the motto "Jeder einmal in Paris" (everyone once in Paris) to provide 'recreational visits' in Paris for its troops. The intensive prostitution during the occupation made way for the Loi de Marthe Richard (1946), which closed the bordellos and reduced stage shows to dancing events.
 1944: a few days after the liberation of Paris, Edith Piaf, who had been a frequent performer at German Forces social and bordello gatherings during the Second World War, and had been considered a traitor by many, performs again at the Moulin Rouge, with Yves Montand, a newcomer chosen to appear with her.

Renewal

 22 June 1951: Georges France, called Jo France, founder of the Balajo (rue de Lappe, Paris), acquires the Moulin Rouge and starts major renovation work. He gives architects Pierre Devinoy, Bernard de La Tour d’Auvergne and Marion Tournon-Branly the task of improving and fitting out the new auditorium. The décor envisaged by Jo France and largely realized by Henri Mahé, one of the most fashionable designers of the day, has lasted and is still in place.
 The evening dances, the acts, and the famous French cancan are back at the Moulin Rouge.
 19 May 1953: the 25th "Bal des Petits Lits Blancs", organised by the novelist Guy des Cars, takes place at the Moulin Rouge in the presence of the French President, Vincent Auriol, and it includes, for the first time on a European stage, Bing Crosby. The evening attracts 1,200 artists and stars from around the world, including Josephine Baker who sings "J'ai deux amours".
 Between 1951 and 1960, a succession of famous artists appears: Luis Mariano, Charles Trénet, Charles Aznavour, Line Renaud, Bourvil, Fernand Raynaud, Lena Horne.
 1955: Jo France transfers the Moulin Rouge to the brothers Joseph and Louis Clérico who already own Le Lido. Jean Bauchet becomes Manager. The famous French cancan is still performed, soon to be choreographed by Ruggero Angeletti.
 1957: Doris Haug creates the "Doriss Girls" troop at the Moulin Rouge. Initially four girls, the troop has eventually grown to sixty.
 1959: the Moulin Rouge is transformed with new kitchens.
 1960	The Revue Japonaise, entirely composed of Japanese artists, launches the Kabuki in Montmartre.
 1962:	Jacki Clérico, son of Joseph Clérico, takes control of the Moulin Rouge. It is the start of a new era: Enlargement of the auditorium, installation of a giant aquarium, and the first aquatic ballet
 1962:	Revue Cancan, devised by Doris Haug and Ruggero Angeletti.
 Since 1963 and the success of the Frou-Frou revue, out of superstition Jacki Clérico chooses only revue titles that start with the letter F. Naturally, the famous French cancan is performed at every revue.
 1963–1965 : Frou-Frou
 1965–1967 : Frisson
 1967–1970 : Fascination
 1970–1973 : Fantastic
 1973–1976 : Festival
 1976–1978 : Follement
 1978–1983 : Frénésie
 1983–1988 : Femmes, femmes, femmes
 1988–1999 : Formidable
 Since 1999: Féerie
 7 September 1979: the Moulin Rouge, again the centre of Paris night life, celebrates its 90th birthday. On stage, for the first time in Paris, Ginger Rogers is surrounded by various stars including Thierry Le Luron, Dalida, Charles Aznavour, Jean-Claude Brialy, George Chakiris, the Village People, Zizi Jeanmaire.
 23 November 1981: the Moulin Rouge closes for one evening to present its show to Her Majesty Queen Elizabeth II.
 4 February 1982: one-off show with Liza Minnelli.
 3 July 1984: gala with Dean Martin.
 25 September 1984: gala with Frank Sinatra.
 1 December 1986: the world's most famous classical dancer, Mikhail Baryshnikov, created an original ballet by Maurice Béjart at the Moulin Rouge.
 20 February 1988: Although the original building had burned down in 1915, the Moulin Rouge turns 100. The premier of the revue Formidable is a "Royal Variety Performance in Paris", a prestigious official event in Britain attended each year in London by a member of the Royal Family. For the second time, the show took place in France, at the Moulin Rouge. Presided over in 1983 by Princess Anne, on 20 February 1988 Prince Edward was the guest of honour.
 Spring 1989: one-off performance by the Moulin Rouge in London before the Prince and Princess of Wales.
 6 October 1989: Centenary gala with Charles Aznavour, Lauren Bacall, Ray Charles, Tony Curtis, Ella Fitzgerald, Gipsy Kings, Margaux Hemingway, Barbara Hendricks, Dorothy Lamour, Jerry Lewis, Jane Russell, Charles Trénet, and Esther Williams.
 1994: Cartier gala in aid of the Artists' Foundation against AIDS with a private concert by Elton John.
 1995: Lancôme gala – launch of the perfume "Poème" with Juliette Binoche. Private concert with Charles Aznavour and Jessye Norman.
 14 November 1999: last showing of the Centenary revue Formidable, seen by more than 4.5 million spectators between 1988 and 1999.
 23 December 1999: first showing of the new revue Féerie.
 24 May 2008: soloist dancer Aleksandar Josipović was master of ceremonies at the 53rd Eurovision Song Contest
 February 2009: for the Year of France in Brazil, and as part of the Rio Carnival, the Moulin Rouge is produced on Copacabana Beach.
 13 January 2013: Moulin Rouge owner Jacki Clérico dies.
 10 August 2014: Mistress du ballet Moulin Rouge since 1957, founder of the Doriss girls (Doris Haug) dies.
 6 October 2014: Moulin Rouge celebrates its 125th anniversary.

Documentaries

Quadrille dansé par les étoiles du Moulin-Rouge 1,2&3 (1899–1902), France – produced by Pathé (3 episodes of 20 min)
An Evening at the Moulin Rouge (1981), Réalisé par David Niles, produced by HBO (length : 60 min)
Les Dessous du Moulin Rouge (2000), Réalisé par Nils Tavernier, produced by Little Bear (length  : 52 min)
Coulisses d'une revue, le Moulin Rouge (2001), directed by par Philippe Pouchain and Yves Riou (length  : 60 min)
Moulin Rouge Forever (2002), directed by Philippe Pouchain and Yves Riou (length: 55 min)
Moulin Rouge : la restauration and Une vie de passion au Moulin Rouge. Two documentaries available with the Moulin Rouge movie of John Huston.
Au cœur du Moulin Rouge (At the heart of Moulin Rouge) (2012), Directed by Marie Vabre, produced by 3e Œil Productions (90 min).

Books

Illustrated books
The Moulin Rouge (1989), by Jacques Pessis and Jacques Crépineau – Publisher: St Martins
The Moulin Rouge (2002), by Jacques Pessis and Jacques Crépineau – Publisher: Le Cherche-Midi
Moulin Rouge, Paris (2002), by Christophe Mirambeau – Publisher: Assouline
Flipbook Moulin Rouge Paris France 23h18, Paris (2003), by Jean-Luc Planche – Publisher: Youpeka

About Moulin Rouge and its characters

 Pierre La Mure Moulin Rouge (1950), a novel based on the life of Henri de Toulouse-Lautrec, Random House
Jose Shercliff Jane Avril of the Moulin Rouge (1954), Macrae Smith Co
 Jean Nohain and François Caradec Le Pétomane 1857–1945 a tribute to the unique act which shook and shattered the Moulin-Rouge (1967), Souvenir Press
 Robert Burleigh Toulouse-Lautrec : The Moulin Rouge And The City Of Light, (2003), Harry N. Abrams

Legacy

Enterprises
The Moulin Rouge in Paris was a source of inspiration for:
 Moulin Rouge Hotel in Las Vegas, Nevada
 The nude revues at the Windmill Theatre, created by Laura Henderson and Vivian Van Damm
 The Moulin Rouge restaurant in Park Street, Kolkata is inspired by this cabaret along with the symbolic windmill.

Film

Moulin Rouge Dancers 1&2 (1898) – United States – silent film about the Moulin Rouge
Queen of the Moulin Rouge (1922), directed by Ray C. Smallwood and Peter Milne – United States – silent film about the Moulin Rouge
Le Fantôme du Moulin Rouge (1925), directed by René Clair – with Sandra Milowanoff and Georges Voltier
Moulin Rouge (1928), directed by Ewald André Dupont – With Olga Tschechowa, Eve Gray and Jean Bradin
Moulin Rouge also titled L'étoile du Moulin Rouge (1934), directed by Sidney Lanfield – with Constance Bennett – United States
La Chaste Suzanne (1937/1938), directed by André Berthomieu – with Raimu and Henri Garat
La P'tite femme du Moulin Rouge (1945), directed by Benito Perojo – with Alberto Bello, Héctor Calcaño, Homero Cárpena, Tilda Thamar
A Night at the Moulin Rouge (1951) is a film (also circulated under the title Ding Dong!) of burlesque acts of the Moulin Rouge club in Oakland, California
Moulin Rouge (1952), directed by John Huston- with José Ferrer, Suzanne Flon and Zsa Zsa Gabor
French Cancan (1955), directed by Jean Renoir – with Jean Gabin, Françoise Arnoul, María Félix, Jean-Roger Caussimon, Gianni Esposito, Philippe Clay, and Michel Piccoli
A Night at the Moulin Rouge (1957), directed by Jean-Claude Roy – with Tilda Thamar, Noël Roquevert, Armand Bernard and Jean Tissier
La Chaste Suzanne (1963), directed by Luis César Amadori – with Armand Mestral, Noël Roquevert and Frédéric Duvallès – Spain/France
Moulin Rouge! (2001), directed by Baz Luhrmann, with Ewan McGregor, Nicole Kidman, John Leguizamo, Jim Broadbent, and Richard Roxburgh
Midnight in Paris (2011), directed by Woody Allen, with Owen Wilson, Marion Cotillard, Rachel McAdams, Tom Hiddleston, Corey Stoll, Kathy Bates, and Adrien Brody - Spain, US

Music
The music video for the "Lady Marmalade" cover act by Christina Aguilera, Pink, Lil' Kim, and Mýa was in a set replica of the Moulin Rouge
Prince and his concert film Sign o' the Times (1987) featured the Moulin Rouge as part of his stage venue and props
The second music video for The Killers' song "Mr. Brightside" was set in the Moulin Rouge

Stage adaptations
The 2018 musical Moulin Rouge! is an adaptation of the 2001 Baz Luhrmann film.

See also

 Absinthe
 Cabaret Red Light
 Jubilee!
 Paradis Latin
 Peepshow
 Sirens of TI
 Tropicana Club

References

External links

 Moulin Rouge official website in English
 Moulin Rouge official website in French
 Moulin Rouge - 42 Early Postcards at CPArama
 La danseuse du Moulin leshumanites Art+CultureDéveloppement
 História do Moulin Rouge
 Moulin Rouge in Times Square - New York Post
 Les 125 ans du Moulin Rouge - Radio France Internationale

 
Cabarets in Paris
Buildings and structures in the 18th arrondissement of Paris
1889 establishments in France
Belle Époque